A polycube is a solid figure formed by joining one or more equal cubes face to face.   Polycubes are the three-dimensional analogues of the planar polyominoes.  The Soma cube, the Bedlam cube, the Diabolical cube, the Slothouber–Graatsma puzzle, and the Conway puzzle are examples of packing problems based on polycubes.

Enumerating polycubes

Like polyominoes, polycubes can be enumerated in two ways, depending on whether chiral pairs of polycubes are counted as one polycube or two. For example, 6 tetracubes have mirror symmetry and one is chiral, giving a count of 7 or 8 tetracubes respectively. Unlike polyominoes, polycubes are usually counted with mirror pairs distinguished, because one cannot turn a polycube over to reflect it as one can a polyomino given three dimensions.  In particular, the Soma cube uses both forms of the chiral tetracube.

Polycubes are classified according to how many cubical cells they have:

Polycubes have been enumerated up to n=16. More recently, specific families of polycubes have been investigated.

Symmetries of polycubes
As with polyominoes, polycubes may be classified according to how many symmetries they have.  Polycube symmetries (conjugacy classes of subgroups of the achiral octahedral group) were first enumerated by W. F. Lunnon in 1972.  Most polycubes are asymmetric, but many have more complex symmetry groups, all the way up to the full symmetry group of the cube with 48 elements.  Numerous other symmetries are possible; for example, there are seven possible forms of 8-fold symmetry

Properties of pentacubes
12 pentacubes are flat and correspond to the pentominoes. 5 of the remaining 17 have mirror symmetry, and the other 12 form 6 chiral pairs.

The bounding boxes of the pentacubes have sizes 5×1×1, 4×2×1, 3×3×1, 3×2×1, 4×2×2, 3×2×2, and 2×2×2.

A polycube may have up to 24 orientations in the cubic lattice, or 48, if reflection is allowed. Of the pentacubes, 2 flats (5-1-1 and the cross) have mirror symmetry in all three axes; these have only three orientations. 10 have one mirror symmetry; these have 12 orientations. Each of the remaining 17 pentacubes has 24 orientations.

Octacube and hypercube unfoldings

The tesseract (four-dimensional hypercube) has eight cubes as its facets, and just as the cube can be unfolded into a hexomino, the tesseract can be unfolded into an octacube. One unfolding, in particular, mimics the well-known unfolding of a cube into a Latin cross: it consists of four cubes stacked one on top of each other, with another four cubes attached to the exposed square faces of the second-from-top cube of the stack, to form a three-dimensional double cross shape. Salvador Dalí used this shape in his 1954 painting Crucifixion (Corpus Hypercubus) and it is described in Robert A. Heinlein's 1940 short story "And He Built a Crooked House". In honor of Dalí, this octacube has been called the Dalí cross. It can tile space.

More generally (answering a question posed by Martin Gardner in 1966), out of all 3811 different free octacubes, 261 are unfoldings of the tesseract.

Boundary connectivity
Although the cubes of a polycube are required to be connected square-to-square, the squares of its boundary are not required to be connected edge-to-edge.
For instance, the 26-cube formed by making a 3×3×3 grid of cubes and then removing the center cube is a valid polycube, in which the boundary of the interior void is not connected to the exterior boundary. It is also not required that the boundary of a polycube form a manifold.
For instance, one of the pentacubes has two cubes that meet edge-to-edge, so that the edge between them is the side of four boundary squares.

If a polycube has the additional property that its complement (the set of integer cubes that do not belong to the polycube) is connected by paths of cubes meeting square-to-square, then the boundary squares of the polycube are necessarily also connected by paths of squares meeting edge-to-edge. That is, in this case the boundary forms a polyominoid.

It is an open problem whether every polycube with a connected boundary can be unfolded to a polyomino, or whether this can always be done with the additional condition that the polyomino tiles the plane.

Dual graph
The structure of a polycube can be visualized by means of a "dual graph" that has a vertex for each cube and an edge for each two cubes that share a square. This is different from the similarly-named notions of a dual polyhedron, and of the dual graph of a surface-embedded graph.

Dual graphs have also been used to define and study special subclasses of the polycubes, such as the ones whose dual graph is a tree.

See also
Tripod packing

References

External links 
Wooden hexacube puzzle by Kadon
Polycube Symmetries
Polycube solver Program (with Lua source code) to fill boxes with polycubes using Algorithm X.

Polyforms
Discrete geometry